The Only Way Out may refer to:

 The Only Way Out (Bush song)
 The Only Way Out (Cliff Richard song)